Samir Abdul Jabbar Ismail Taha, also known as Samir Taha, (Born on 15 July 1961 in the city of Jenin – ) was a Palestinian physician, diplomat and member of the nationalist party Fatah.

He was appointed ambassador of the State of Palestine to Sudan. On March 20, 2013, he presented his official credentials to the Sudanese President Omar al-Bashir.

See also 
 Palestine-Sudan relations
 Embassy of the State of Palestine in Sudan

References 

20th-century Palestinian physicians
People from Jenin
Fatah members
University of Khartoum alumni
1961 births
Ambassadors of the State of Palestine to Sudan
Living people